Powidz-Osiedle  is a village in the administrative district of Gmina Powidz, within Słupca County, Greater Poland Voivodeship, in west-central Poland.

References

Powidz-Osiedle